Hålandsdal Church is a parish church of the Church of Norway in Bjørnafjorden Municipality in Vestland county, Norway. It is located in the village of Eide in the Hålandsdal valley. It is one of the churches for the Fusa parish which is part of the Fana prosti (deanery) in the Diocese of Bjørgvin. The white, wooden church was built in a long church design in 1890 using plans drawn up by the architect Karl Hansen Askeland. The church seats about 250 people.

History
Karl Askeland was hired as the architect and lead builder. This new church was completed in 1890 and was consecrate on 20 November 1890 by the Bishop Fredrik Hvoslef. After this church was opened, the Old Hålandsdal Church was renamed Holdhus Church and it was closed and later converted to a museum. The old church served the Hålandsdalen valley from the 14th century until 1890 when the new church was opened. The new Hålandsdal Church was remodeled in 1978 and the church porch under the tower was enlarged to add bathrooms and storage as well as a larger entrance area.

See also
List of churches in Bjørgvin

References

Bjørnafjorden
Churches in Vestland
Long churches in Norway
Wooden churches in Norway
19th-century Church of Norway church buildings
Churches completed in 1890
1890 establishments in Norway